Gerben Last (born 19 October 1985) is a Dutch para table tennis player. He represented the Netherlands at the Summer Paralympics in 2004, 2008, 2012 and 2016.

At the 2004 Summer Paralympics he won the gold medal in the men's team C9 event. He won two medals in individual table tennis events: the bronze medal in the men's individual C9 event at the 2012 Summer Paralympics and the silver medal in the men's individual C9 at the 2016 Summer Paralympics.

In 2004 he received the Order of the Netherlands Lion decoration.

References 

Living people
1985 births
Place of birth missing (living people)
Paralympic table tennis players of the Netherlands
Table tennis players at the 2004 Summer Paralympics
Table tennis players at the 2008 Summer Paralympics
Table tennis players at the 2012 Summer Paralympics
Table tennis players at the 2016 Summer Paralympics
Medalists at the 2004 Summer Paralympics
Medalists at the 2012 Summer Paralympics
Medalists at the 2016 Summer Paralympics
Paralympic gold medalists for the Netherlands
Paralympic silver medalists for the Netherlands
Paralympic bronze medalists for the Netherlands
Paralympic medalists in table tennis
Dutch male table tennis players
21st-century Dutch people